Antonio Ángel Algora Hernando (2 October 1940 – 15 October 2020) was a Spanish prelate of the Catholic Church who served as bishop of Teruel and Albarracín from 1985 to 2003 and Ciudad Real from 2003 to 2016. 

He died from complications of COVID-19 during the COVID-19 pandemic in Spain, in Madrid, thirteen days after his 80th birthday.

References

1940 births
2020 deaths
People from Comunidad de Calatayud
21st-century Roman Catholic bishops in Spain
Deaths from the COVID-19 pandemic in Spain
20th-century Roman Catholic bishops in Spain